L'Épine is a commune in the Vendée department in the Pays de la Loire region in western France. It lies on the island of Noirmoutier.

Geography 
The altitude of the commune of L'Épine lies between 0 and 17 meters. The area of the commune is 8.95 km2.

See also
Communes of the Vendée department

References

Communes of Vendée